Morland Wilson is a Jamaican politician from the Labour Party.  

Mr Morland Wilson, is Jamaica Labour Party Member of Parliament Westmoreland Western, is the epitome of the new Jamaica, the demonstration of the Party’s embrace of youth and innovation.    He did not have to “pay his dues and wait his turn” to arrive at this level of representational politics burnt out and grasping for rewards and power.   Morland is one of the new generation of “young turks” in politics with a Master’s degree in Public Administration, bursting with energy, vigour, enthusiasm, initiatives and a desire to manage change and advance the constituency and the country as a whole.

Mr. Wilson was not “sent” to the constituency, he was in fact born there, the son of a soldier/farmer and housewife, in Burnt Savannah, attending Samuels Preparatory School, Mannings School before attending the UWI in Kingston.   He got his early political exposure in the G2K, rising to the rank of Deputy General Secretary and developing a deep desire to represent the voices of those yearning to be heard. 

What better place to start than the place he has lived and knows the culture, needs and aspirations of the citizens of the constituency and the parish.  He is here, best suited to present their development plan to the highest authority in the country and to lead and manage the growth process.    

Mr Wilson has had significant leadership and management experience, having worked with the Ministry of Agriculture and Fisheries, British Council and the European Union principally in the development of programmes and funding for rural and urban enablement, improvement in disenfranchised areas and human rights.     This naturally enhanced his own self-development desires and he soon embraced his entrepreneurship spirit and established his own business, first in agriculture and then in the area of consumer durables, training and education.

Prior to becoming Member of Parliament, Mr. Wilson has been assiduously working to improve the living conditions and opportunities of the constituents through advocating for road repairs, provision of water, assistance to the indigent and training and education for youths.

As a Representative Member of Parliament Mr. Wilson is providing opportunities for youths to mirror his own development, assist the entrepreneurial in building their dreams, source national and international funding for community and infrastructural development and prioritize education, training and job creation. 

He is actively formulating plans for mega development and various community enterprises and initiatives to provide economic opportunities in both job creation and spinoff activities in anticipation of his endorsement by the voters of the constituency of Western Westmoreland.

Mr. Morland Wilson with his youth, intellectual acumen, vitality and personal commitment has been chosen, and should be chosen by both the party and the people as the instrument of change for a rejuvenated constituency.

References 

Living people
21st-century Jamaican politicians
People from Westmoreland Parish
Members of the House of Representatives of Jamaica
Jamaica Labour Party politicians
University of the West Indies alumni
Year of birth missing (living people)
Members of the 14th Parliament of Jamaica